Arshad-uz Zaman was an ambassador of Bangladesh and former Advisor to President Badruddoza Chowdhury.

Early life
Zaman was born in Bagerhat District. His father was Khan Bahadur Fazlur Rahman. He graduated from the University of Calcutta. He then studied at the Instituts d'études politiques at Sorbonne Université.

Career
In 1962–1963, Zaman served as the press attaché at the Permanent Mission of Pakistan to the United Nations.

Zaman served as the ambassador of Bangladesh to Algeria, Senegal, and Egypt. He served in the Organisation of Islamic Conference as the Assistant Secretary General for Political Affairs. His lifelong affection for France and its language, which included his translation of the works of Andre Malraux into Bengali, was recognised by a Legion of Honour award by the French government.

After retiring as a diplomat he wrote in a number of Bangladeshi newspapers such as the Janakantha, Dhaka Courier, and The Daily Star. He also worked as the advisor to President Badruddoza Chowdhury. In 2000, he published a memoir called Privileged Witness: Memoirs of a Diplomat. He was a Presidium member of Bikalpa Dhara Bangladesh.

Personal life
Zaman was serving in the Pakistan consulate in the 1950s and studied Turkish under Vasfiye Kalmuk. He married her and they had two daughter; Jazmin and Amberin Zaman, a Turkish journalist.

Death
Zaman died of cardiac arrest on 12 April 2008 at the United Hospital in Bangladesh.

References

See also

 Legion of Honour
 List of Legion of Honour recipients by name (Z)
 List of foreign recipients of the Legion of Honour by country
 Legion of Honour Museum

2008 deaths
Ambassadors of Bangladesh to Algeria
Ambassadors of Bangladesh to Egypt
Ambassadors of Bangladesh to Senegal
People from Bagerhat District
Bikalpa Dhara Bangladesh politicians